Russell Grant Foster, CBE, FRS FMedSci (born 1959) is a British professor of circadian neuroscience, the Director of the Nuffield Laboratory of Ophthalmology and the Head of the Sleep and Circadian Neuroscience Institute (SCNi). He is also a Nicholas Kurti Senior Fellow at Brasenose College at the University of Oxford. Foster and his group are credited with key contributions to the discovery of the non-rod, non-cone, photosensitive retinal ganglion cells (pRGCs) in the mammalian retina which provide input to the circadian rhythm system. He has written and co-authored over a hundred scientific publications.

Since 2018 he has been Editor-in-Chief of the Royal Society journal Interface Focus.

Biography

Education 
Foster attended Heron Wood School in his native Aldershot and studied at the University of Bristol and graduated with a Bachelor of Science (BSc) in Zoology in 1980.  He also carried out postgraduate studies at the University of Bristol under the supervision of Brian Follett, and was awarded a PhD in 1984 for his thesis entitled An investigation of the extraretinal photoreceptors mediating photoperiodic induction in the Japanese quail (Coturnix coturnix japonica).

Career 
From 1988 to 1995 Foster was a member of the National Science Foundation Center for Biological Rhythms at the University of Virginia, where he worked closely with Michael Menaker. In 1995, he returned to UK and started his own lab at Imperial College, where he became Chair of Molecular Neuroscience within the Faculty of Medicine. He later transferred his laboratory to the University of Oxford to engage in more translational research.

Scientific works

Transplanted suprachiasmatic nucleus determines circadian period 
While at the University of Virginia, Foster and Menaker performed experiments where the suprachiasmatic nucleus (SCN) was tested by neural transplantation of donor's SCN to a recipient with an ablated SCN. In the experiment, the donor was a mutant strain of hamster with a shortened circadian period. The recipient was a wild-type hamster. Transplantation was done the other way around as well, with wild-type hamster as the donor and mutant strain hamster as the recipient. After the transplantation, the formerly wild-type hamster displayed a shortened period which resembled the mutant, and the mutant-strain hamster showed normal period. The SCN restored rhythm to arrhythmic recipients, which afterwards always exhibited the circadian period of the donor. This result led to the conclusion that the SCN is sufficient and necessary for mammalian circadian rhythms.

Rods and cones unnecessary for entrainment 
In 1991, Foster and his colleagues provided evidence that rods and cones are not necessary for entrainment of an animal to light. In this experiment, Foster gave light pulses to retinally degenerative mice. These mice were homozygous for the rd allele and were shown to have no rods in their retina. Only a few cones were found to remain in the retina. To study the effects of light entrainment, magnitude of phase shift of locomotor activity was measured. The results showed that both mice with normal retina and mice with degenerate retina showed similar entrainment patterns. Foster hypothesized that circadian photoreception occurs with a small number of cones without an outer layer or that an unrecognised class of photoreceptive cells are present.

In 1999, Foster studied light entrainment on mice without cones or both rods and cones. Mice without cones or without both photoreceptive cells (rd/rd cl allele) still entrained to light. Meanwhile, mice with eyes removed could not entrain to light. Foster concluded that rods and cones are unnecessary for entrainment to light, and that the murine eye contains additional photoreceptive cell types. Later studies showed that melanopsin expressing photoreceptive retinal ganglion cells (pGRCs) were accountable for non-rod, non-cone entrainment to light.

Literary works 
He is the co-author with writer and broadcaster Leon Kreitzman of two popular science books on circadian rhythms, Rhythms of Life: The Biological Clocks that Control the Daily Lives of Every Living Thing and Seasons of Life: The Biological Rhythms That Enable Living Things to Thrive and Survive. He has also co-written a book titled Sleep: a Very Short Introduction.

Awards and honours
Foster was elected a fellow of the Royal Society in 2008.

Foster was appointed Commander of the Order of the British Empire (CBE) in the 2015 New Year Honours for services to science.

Russell Foster was awarded with The Daylight Award 2020 in the category Daylight Research, for his clinical studies in humans addressing important questions regarding light.

Notable awards 
Foster has received recognition from around the world for his discovery of pRGCs:
 Honma Prize (Japan, 1997)
 David G. Cogan Award (USA, 2001)
 Zoological Society Scientific Medal (UK, 2000)
 Edridge Green Medal (Royal College of Ophthalmologists, UK, 2005)
 The Daylight Award 2020, for Daylight Research

References

External links 
 Foster webpage at Oxford University
 
 'Why do we sleep?" (TEDGlobal 2013)

1959 births
Living people
Scientists from Aldershot
People educated at Alderwood School
British neuroscientists
Sleep researchers
Chronobiologists
Commanders of the Order of the British Empire
Fellows of the Royal Society
Fellows of Brasenose College, Oxford
Alumni of the University of Bristol